This partial list of city nicknames in Nevada compiles the aliases, sobriquets and slogans that cities and towns in Nevada are known by (or have been known by historically), officially and unofficially, to municipal governments, local people, outsiders or their tourism boards or chambers of commerce. City nicknames can help in establishing a civic identity, helping outsiders recognize a community or attracting people to a community because of its nickname; promote civic pride; and build community unity. Nicknames and slogans that successfully create a new community "ideology or myth" are also believed to have economic value. Their economic value is difficult to measure, but there are anecdotal reports of cities that have achieved substantial economic benefits by "branding" themselves by adopting new slogans.

In 2005 the consultancy Tagline Guru conducted a small survey of professionals in the fields of branding, marketing, and advertising aimed at identifying the "best" U.S. city slogans and nicknames. Participants evaluated about 800 nicknames and 400 slogans on the criteria of whether the nickname or slogan expresses the "brand character, affinity, style, and personality" of the city, whether it "tells a story in a clever, fun, and memorable way," uniqueness and originality, and whether it "inspires you to visit there, live there, or learn more." The second-ranked nickname in the survey was the Las Vegas nickname "Sin City", behind only New York City's "The Big Apple." Las Vegas also had the top-rated slogan: "What Happens Here, Stays Here."

Some unofficial nicknames are positive, while others are derisive. The unofficial nicknames listed here have been in use for a long time or have gained wide currency.
Beatty – Gateway to Death Valley
Boulder City – Home of Hoover Dam
Caliente – City of Roses
Eureka – The Friendliest Town on The Loneliest Road
Fallon – The Oasis of Nevada
Genoa – Home of the Candy Dance
Las Vegas
Gambling Capital of the World
Entertainment Capital of the World
Sin CityLas Vegas: Sin City Finally Gets Its Reputation Back , Curve (magazine),  accessed April 8, 2007.
City of Lost Wages
Reno
The Biggest Little City in the WorldCity of Reno Visitors page, accessed April 8, 2007. "Welcome to the Biggest Little City in the World!"
The Neon Babylon
Sparks – The Rail City
Tonopah – Queen of the Silver Camps
Virginia City – The Richest Place on Earth
West Wendover – Where the West Begins
Winnemucca – City of Paved StreetsWinnemucca , The Columbia Gazetteer of North America, accessed April 8, 2007. "Advertises itself as 'city of paved streets.'"            
Yerington – The Onion Capital of the West

See also
 List of cities in Nevada
 List of city nicknames in the United States

References

Nevada cities and towns
Populated places in Nevada
City nicknames